Julian Woods may refer to:

 Julian Tenison-Woods (1832–1889), English Catholic priest and geologist
 Julian Woods (cricketer) (1887–1975), Australian cricketer